Yevlakh District is one of the 66 districts of Azerbaijan. It is located in the centre of the country and belongs to the Central Aran Economic Region. The district borders the districts of Qakh, Shaki, Agdash, Barda, Tartar, Goranboy, and Samukh. Its capital and largest city is Yevlakh. As of 2020, the district had a population of 129,700.

History 
Yevlakh was called as a Yevlakh village of Elisabethpol Governorate on official documents belonging to the beginning of the 19th century, was called as Dzhevanshirsky Uyezd during the years between 1920 and 1935. The Yevlakh region was created on February 20, 1935, by the decision of the Central Executive Committee of the Azerbaijan SSR. Yevlakh became a city on February 1, 1939, according to the decision of the Supreme Soviet of the Azerbaijan SSR.

Yevlakh-Khankendi, Yevlakh-Balakan railway, Yevlakh Airport, Khaldan village secondary school, Chess school, Children's youth sports school, 19 secondary schools with 10535 seats, 15 kindergartens with 840 seats, a hospital, educational establishments, multi-storey residential buildings were commissioned and put into operation.

On 26 December 1962, the Yevlakh area was cancelled and its domain was exchanged to Agdash, Barda and Gasim Ismayilov district by the choice of the 10th session of the Supreme Soviet of the Azerbaijan SSR and turned into the industrial city of Yevlakh republic. Yevlakh has been a free region since 1965.

On 6 January 1965, Yevlakh was included in the list of subordinated cities and the development of industrial undertakings  has been started in Yevlakh by the decree of the Presidium of the Supreme Soviet of the Azerbaijani SSR.

Economy 
Yevlakh is one of the important agricultural districts of the country. The grain and cotton growing, as well as cattle breeding sectors have played an important role in the city economy. The farmers grow potato, vegetable, water-melon and fruits, as well.

Yevlakh city is also rich with natural resources like clay mixture sand deposits, as well as clay, sand and gravel deposits needed for brick making.

Baku-Gazakh highway, Yevlakh-Balakan, Baku-Tbilisi railway, Baku-Supsa gas and Baku-Tbilisi-Jeyhan oil pipeline extend through the territory of the district. Yevlakh city also has a domestic airport.

Relief 
Yevlakh is 293 km far from Baku on the right bank of the Kura waterway. (South-east of Ganja-Gazakh plain, the north-western portion of Shirvan and Garabagh fields). Yevlakh is on the old Silk Way. There are a mild-warm semi-desert and dry field climate within the winter. Kura waterway, Inchachay, Korchay and Alican passes through the domain. In the south eastern portion of Mingachevir water store, the Varvara water store is found in Yevlakh. Upper Garabagh and Upper Shirvan canals are within the district.

Population 
Table of population of the district.

Education 
There are 57 general education schools in the region. Ten of these schools are located in the city and 47 of them are in the settlements and villages of Yevlakh district. 26 kindergartens operate in the Yevlakh district. 7 of them are located in the city and 19 of them are in the villages. In addition, there are 5 educational institutions such as two Children's Youth Sports Schools, Chess School, Children's Creative Center and Technical Creative Center.

References 

 
Districts of Azerbaijan